Carex asynchrona is a tussock-forming species of perennial sedge in the family Cyperaceae. It is native to parts of north eastern Mexico.

See also
List of Carex species

References

asynchrona
Plants described in 1989
Flora of Mexico